Espers is the self-titled debut studio album by the band Espers. It was released in 2004 on Locust Music. The album was produced by the group's original trio and establishes their contemporary psychedelic folk sound.

Track listing
"Flowery Noontide" - 4:10
"Meadow" - 4:11
"Riding" - 4:09
"Voices" - 3:44
"Hearts & Daggers" - 8:34
"Byss & Abyss" - 6:03
"Daughter" - 3:03
"Travel Mountains" - 6:30

References

2004 debut albums
Espers (band) albums
Wichita Recordings albums